In France, the Répertoire national des certifications professionnelles (RNCP) has been created by article L. 335-6 of the Code de l'éducation (Education Code).

The répertoire national des certifications professionnelles has for purpose to make available to individuals and businesses constantly update information on educational degrees and certificates on the lists established by the commissions paritaires nationales de l'emploi des branches professionnelles (national commissions). It helps to facilitate access to employment, human resources management and mobility.

Certifications stored in the directory are recognized throughout the country.

Registration in the national directory is only for the certification itself.

Under the authority of the Minister for Vocational Training, the Commission nationale de la certification professionnelle establishes and updates the répertoire national des certifications professionnelles. It ensures the renewal and adaptation of diplomas.

Degrees are classified in the répertoire national des certifications professionnelles by field of activity and level. For this criterion, until the adoption of the new classification referred to in article 8 of decree of 26 April 2002 referred to above, diplomas are classified according to the National Classification of Levels of Training approved by decision of the permanent group of vocational training and social advancement.

Professional fields 
 Personal services to people
 Personal services to businesses and communities
 Public safety personnel
 Administrative staff
 Personal services business
 Staff of the hotel
 Catering staff
 Staff cafe, bar and brasserie
 Staff distribution
 For Sales
 Staff sales force
 Arts professionals
 Entertainers
 Professional training
 Professionals in the social and cultural intervention
 Professionals in the socio-economic intervention
 Allied health professionals
 Medico-technical professionals
 Rehabilitation professionals and equipment
 Health practitioners
 Technical medical practitioners
 Senior administrative management
 Professional information and communication
 Professionals
 Executives of commercial management
 Bank executives, insurance and real estate
 Executives
 Staff of agricultural production
 Other Fishing and maritime and river navigation
 Staff of the shell and Public Works
 Staff finishing work
 Operating Engineers land transport
 Operating Engineers maneuver, civil engineering and agricultural
 Logistics personnel (handling, management and operation of transport)
 Accompanying personnel transport
 Staff of mechanical engineering and metalworking
 Staff of electrical and electronic
 Maintenance personnel, maintenance
 Drivers installation chemical, power generation ...
 Drivers installation of metallurgy and materials
 Drivers installation of heavy industry of wood and paper and cardboard
 Staff functions for cross-sectoral process industries
 Staff of flexible materials industries (textiles, clothing, leather)
 Staff of the printing industry
 Staff Industry Furniture and timber
 Personal Power
 Staff handcrafted clothing, leather and textile
 Staff of craft materials
 Staff various craft
 Extension agents, machine
 Supervisory staff maintenance
 Technicians for the preparation of production
 Manufacturing technicians, control
 Installation technicians, maintenance
 Frames preparation techniques of production
 Technical managers of production
 Technical sales managers and maintenance
 Supervisors, technicians and engineers of agriculture ...
 Supervisors, technicians and building engineers ...
 Technicians and managers of transportation and logistics

See also
Commission nationale de la certification professionnelle
Education in France

References

External links 
 

Education in France
2002 establishments in France